Emiliano García-Page Sánchez (born 11 June 1968) is a Spanish politician from the Spanish Socialist Workers' Party who is the President of Castile-La Mancha since 2015.

García-Page was the Mayor of Toledo from 2007 to 2015; after the 2015 city council election he was succeeded in the position by Milagros Tolón.

References

External links
 Emiliano García-Page Sánchez Junta of Communities of Castile-La Mancha website

1968 births
Living people
Spanish Socialist Workers' Party politicians
Presidents of Castilla–La Mancha
Government ministers of Castilla–La Mancha
Members of the 5th Cortes of Castilla–La Mancha
Members of the 6th Cortes of Castilla–La Mancha
Members of the 9th Cortes of Castilla–La Mancha
Members of the Cortes of Castilla–La Mancha from Toledo
Spanish municipal councillors
Public works ministers of Spanish autonomous communities
Mayors of places in Castilla–La Mancha
Members of the 10th Cortes of Castilla–La Mancha